Dominique Dafney (born June 3, 1997) is an American football tight end for the Tampa Bay Buccaneers of the National Football League (NFL). He played college football at Iowa and Indiana State, and signed with the Indianapolis Colts as an undrafted free agent in 2020. He has also played for the Green Bay Packers.

Collegiate career
Dafney began his career at Iowa Western Community College, spending one season as a reserve wide receiver before transferring to the University of Iowa as a preferred walk-on. Dafney played two seasons, mostly on special teams, with the Hawkeyes. He transferred to Indiana State after his junior year as a graduate transfer. In his only season with the Sycamores, Dafney rushed for 439 yards and caught 15 passes for 196 yards and scored seven touchdowns and was named second-team All-Missouri Valley Football Conference at fullback.

Professional career

Indianapolis Colts
Dafney was signed by the Indianapolis Colts as an undrafted free agent August 26, 2020. He was waived by the Colts on September 8, 2020, during final roster cuts.

Green Bay Packers
The Green Bay Packers signed Dafney to their practice squad on October 12, 2020. He was elevated to the active roster on December 5 for the team's week 13 game against the Philadelphia Eagles, and reverted to the practice squad after the game. He was promoted to the active roster on December 12. On December 27, he recorded his first NFL catch, a 13-yard reception from Aaron Rodgers, during a Week 16 victory over the Tennessee Titans. On January 3, 2021, Dafney caught his first NFL touchdown during a Week 17 win against the Chicago Bears.

On September 25, 2021, Dafney was placed on injured reserve. He was reactivated on October 28, 2021. He signed his tender offer from the Packers on April 18, 2022, to keep him with the team. He was waived/injured on August 16, 2022 and placed on injured reserve. The Packers reached an injury settlement with Dafney on August 22, 2022, making him a free agent.

Denver Broncos
On September 13, 2022, Dafney was signed to the Denver Broncos practice squad. He was released on October 10, 2022.

Indianapolis Colts (second stint)
On December 20, 2022, Dafney was signed to the Indianapolis Colts practice squad. He was released on December 29.

Tampa Bay Buccaneers
On January 23, 2023, Dafney signed a reserve/future contract with the Tampa Bay Buccaneers.

NFL career statistics

Regular season

References

External links
Iowa Hawkeyes bio
Indiana State Sycamores bio
Green Bay Packers bio

Living people
Players of American football from Iowa
American football tight ends
Indiana State Sycamores football players
Indianapolis Colts players
Green Bay Packers players
Iowa Western Reivers football players
People from West Des Moines, Iowa
Iowa Hawkeyes football players
1997 births
African-American players of American football
Players of American football from North Carolina
21st-century African-American sportspeople
Denver Broncos players
Tampa Bay Buccaneers players